The Ohoopee River is a  river in east-central Georgia in the United States.  It is a tributary of the Altamaha River, which flows to the Atlantic Ocean.

Course

In popular culture

The Ohoopee River is referenced in Larry Jon Wilson's song, "Ohoopee River Bottomland", which appears on Wilson's 1975 album, New Beginnings. Wilson also sings the song in the 1980 documentary, Heartworn Highways. Wilson was born in Swainsboro, just north of the Ohoopee River.

The river valley has recently become the site of a yearly music festival known as "Curly Fest" featuring regional artists.

Local people pronounce the double o as short, not long. That is, more like "foot," than "boot." They also call it the 'Hoopee for short.

See also
List of Georgia rivers

References

Columbia Gazetteer of North America entry
DeLorme (2003).  Georgia Atlas & Gazetteer.  Yarmouth, Maine: DeLorme.  .

Rivers of Georgia (U.S. state)
Rivers of Candler County, Georgia
Rivers of Emanuel County, Georgia
Rivers of Johnson County, Georgia
Rivers of Tattnall County, Georgia
Rivers of Toombs County, Georgia
Rivers of Treutlen County, Georgia
Rivers of Washington County, Georgia